John Aalberg (born 14 October 1960) is a Norwegian-born American skier. He competed in cross-country skiing events at the 1992 and 1994 Winter Olympics.

References

External links
 

1960 births
Living people
Cross-country skiers at the 1992 Winter Olympics
Cross-country skiers at the 1994 Winter Olympics
American male cross-country skiers
Olympic cross-country skiers of the United States
Norwegian emigrants to the United States
People from Ørland